Globe is an unincorporated community in Lane County, in the U.S. state of Oregon. Wildcat Creek, a tributary of the Siuslaw River, flows by Globe. One of the creek's tributaries, Pataha Creek, enters the larger stream at Globe.

References

Unincorporated communities in Lane County, Oregon
Unincorporated communities in Oregon